Robert Curry (1882–1944), was an American wrestler.

Robert Curry may also refer to:

Robert Curry (singer)
Robert Houston Curry (1842–1892), Louisiana politician
Robert Curry (musicologist and pianist) (1952-) Australian pianist and musicologist

See also
Robert Curry Cameron (1925–1972), American astronomer
Robert Currie (disambiguation)